Pandharpur railway station  is a railway station serving Pandharpur town, in Solapur district of Maharashtra State of India. It is under Solapur railway division of Central Railway Zone of IndiaRailwaysys.

▪️There is demand of passengers to start Mumbai CSMT - Miraj  express via Pandharpur on daily basis so that it can connect people of Pandharpur, sangola & Jath with capital city Mumbai and medical city Miraj of Western Maharashtra.

It is located at 469 m above sea level and has three platforms. As of 2016, a single broad gauge railway line serves at this station.  Eight trains stop in addition to four originating trains and four terminating trains. Solapur Airport Maharashtra.

▪️There is demand of passengers to start Mumbai CSMT - Miraj  express via Pandharpur on daily basis so that it can connect people of Pandharpur, sangola & Jath with capital city Mumbai and medical city Miraj of Western Maharashtra.

.

References

Solapur railway division
Railway stations in Solapur district